Taste of Cherry (Ta’m-e gīlās...) is a 1997 Iranian minimalist drama film written, produced, edited and directed by Abbas Kiarostami, and starring Homayoun Ershadi as a middle-aged Tehran man, who drives through a city suburb, in search of someone willing to carry out the task of burying him after he commits suicide. The film won the Palme d'Or at the 1997 Cannes Film Festival, which it shared with The Eel.

Plot summary
Mr. Badii, a middle-aged man, drives through Tehran looking for someone to do a job for him, for which he offers a large amount of money. During his drives with prospective candidates, Badii reveals that he plans to kill himself and has already dug the grave. He tells the people he is soliciting to go to the spot he has chosen the next morning, and either help him up, if he has chosen to live, or to bury him, if he has chosen to die. He does not discuss why he wants to commit suicide.

His first recruit is a young, shy Kurdish soldier, who refuses to do the job and flees from Badii's car. His second recruit is an Afghan seminarist, who also declines because he has religious objections to suicide. The third is Mr. Bagheri, an Azeri taxidermist. He is willing to help Badii because he needs the money for his sick child. He tries to convince Badii not to commit suicide, and reveals that he too wanted to commit suicide in 1960 but chose to live when, after failing his attempt, he tasted mulberries which dropped from a tree, and reveals that he then went home with the mulberries, and gave it to his wife, which she enjoyed. He continues to discuss what he perceives to be the beauty of life, including sunrises and the moon and stars. Bagheri promises to throw dirt on Badii if he finds him dead in the morning. Badii drops him back at his workplace, but suddenly runs back to meet him, requesting that Bagheri confirm if he's actually dead by throwing some stones at him and jolting him awake, in case he is asleep.

That night, Badii lies in his grave while a thunderstorm begins. After a long blackout, the film ends by breaking the fourth wall with camcorder footage of Kiarostami and the film crew filming Taste of Cherry, leaving Badii's choice unknown.

Cast
 Homayoun Ershadi as Mr. Badii 
 Abdolrahman Bagheri as Mr. Bagheri, the taxidermist
 Afshin Khorshid Bakhtiari as Worker
 Safar Ali Moradi as Soldier
 Mir Hossein Noori as Seminarian

Style

The film is minimalist in that it is shot primarily with long takes; the pace is leisurely and there are long periods of ambient (background) sound, which the closing sequence shows the crew recording. Mr. Badii is rarely shown in the same shot as the person he is talking to (this is partly because during the filming, director Kiarostami was sitting in the car's passenger seat).

Music
The film does not include a background score, except for the ending titles. This features a trumpet piece, Louis Armstrong's 1929 adaptation of "St. James Infirmary Blues." The only other song featured in the film is "Khuda Bowad Yaret" (May God be your protector) by Afghan singer Ahmad Zaher, which is played in the background on a radio about 38 minutes into the film.

Release
Taste of Cherry was awarded the prestigious Palme d'Or at the 1997 Cannes Film Festival in the year of its release, tied with Shohei Imamura's The Eel.

Reception
On the review aggregator website Rotten Tomatoes the film has an approval rating of 83% based on 40 reviews, with the "critics consensus" reading, "Taste of Cherry's somewhat simple aesthetic belies a richly ambiguous character study with an impressively ambitious thematic scale." Rob Aldam of Backseat Mafia described the film as "an assured and studied meditation on the question of whether life is worth living". Matthew Lucas of From the Front Row wrote: 

Stephen Holden of The New York Times called the film "simultaneously epic and precisely minuscule", writing that "it isn't until Badii meets the taxidermist that the film finds a lyrical voice to match its powerful visual imagery. His gorgeous, rough-hewn soliloquy about regaining his zest for life after trying to hang himself from a mulberry tree is a simple, eloquent parable of the senses opening to the refreshment of life's simple pleasures." According to Stanley Kauffman of The New Republic, "As the film's design becomes clear to us, a quiet spaciousness begins to inhabit it."

Of the minority of negative reviews, Roger Ebert's in The Chicago Sun-Times was the most scathing, giving the film 1 out of 4 stars. Ebert dismissed the film as "excruciatingly boring" and added, "I understand intellectually what Kiarostami is doing. I am not impatiently asking for action or incident. What I do feel, however, is that Kiarostami's style here is an affectation; the subject matter does not make it necessary, and is not benefited by it. If we're to feel sympathy for Badhi, wouldn't it help to know more about him? To know, in fact, anything at all about him? What purpose does it serve to suggest at first he may be a homosexual? (Not what purpose for the audience--what purpose for Badhi himself? Surely he must be aware his intentions are being misinterpreted.) And why must we see Kiarostami's camera crew--a tiresome distancing strategy to remind us we are seeing a movie? If there is one thing Taste of Cherry does not need, it is such a reminder: The film is such a lifeless drone that we experience it only as a movie."

Ebert later went on to add the film to a list of his most hated movies of all time.

In his own review of Kiarostami's film, critic Jonathan Rosenbaum of the Chicago Reader awarded it a full four stars. Responding to Ebert's criticisms, Rosenbaum wrote: "A colleague who finds Taste of Cherry "excruciatingly boring" objects in particular to the fact that we don’t know anything about Badii, to what he sees as the distracting suggestion that Badii might be a homosexual looking for sex, and to what he sees as the tired "distancing strategy" of reminding us at the end that we’re seeing a movie. From the perspective of the history of commercial Western cinema, he has a point on all three counts. But Kiarostami couldn’t care less about conforming to that perspective, and given what he can do, I can’t think of any reason he should care... the most important thing about the joyful finale is that it’s the precise opposite of a "distancing effect." It does invite us into the laboratory from which the film sprang and places us on an equal footing with the filmmaker, yet it does this in a spirit of collective euphoria, suddenly liberating us from the oppressive solitude and darkness of Badii alone in his grave... Kiarostami is representing life in all its rich complexity, reconfiguring elements from the preceding 80-odd minutes in video to clarify what’s real and what’s concocted... Far from affirming that Taste of Cherry is "only" a movie, this wonderful ending is saying, among other things, that it’s also a movie."

Since the film's release, multiple other critics have also declared it a masterpiece; in the British Film Institute's 2012 Sight & Sound poll, six critics and two directors named Taste of Cherry one of the 10 best films ever made. It was also named the 9th best film of the 90s by Slant Magazine. About the ending and its detractors, Calum Marsh wrote:

Home media
On June 1, 1999, The Criterion Collection released the film onto DVD. On July 21, 2020, Criterion released the film on Blu-ray with a new 4K restoration.

References

External links

 
 
Taste of Cherry an essay by Godfrey Cheshire at the Criterion Collection

1997 films
1990s drama road movies
Iranian drama films
1990s Persian-language films
Films about suicide
Films set in Tehran
Films set in Iran
Palme d'Or winners
Films directed by Abbas Kiarostami
Self-reflexive films
1997 drama films